Rebekah Grindlay was the Australian Ambassador to Lebanon from 2018 to 2022. She has been called "the rising star of Australian diplomacy". 

Her appointment was announced 10 October 2018 and she served in the role until 2022.

Grindlay earned a Master of Public Policy from Princeton University and a Bachelor of Commerce from Sydney University.

References

Living people
Year of birth missing (living people)
Australian women ambassadors
Ambassadors of Australia to Lebanon
University of Sydney Business School alumni
Princeton School of Public and International Affairs alumni